Lycianthes rantonnetii, the blue potato bush or Paraguay nightshade,  is a species of flowering plant in the nightshade family Solanaceae, native to South America. A profusion of trumpet-shaped, bright blue-purple flowers with a prominent yellow eye appear in summer, followed by red berries. It is widely cultivated and may be hardy in mild or coastal areas. Alternatively it can be grown in a container and brought under cover in winter. It requires a sheltered location in full sun. Though related to food plants like the potato and tomato, all parts of the plant are considered toxic to humans.

It has been given the Royal Horticultural Society’s Award of Garden Merit. 

The species is named for Barthélémy Victor Rantonnet, a 19th-century French horticulturalist.

Lycianthes rantonnetii has previously been placed in Solanum, a huge genus which has recently been the subject of major investigation, with species being transferred to and from several different genera. There are many rare and little-known species whose true placement has yet to be determined.

References

Flora of Argentina
Flora of Bolivia
Flora of Brazil
Flora of Paraguay
rantonnetii
Plants described in 1859
Taxa named by Élie-Abel Carrière